Daniel Augustus Lartey (1 August 1926 – 28 December 2009) popularly known as Dan Lartey was a Ghanaian politician in the 2000, and 2004 presidential candidate of the Great Consolidated Popular Party (GCPP). He was a former publisher and labour unionist, he became a household name in Ghana following his famous 2004 presidential elections campaign mantra; ‘domestication’, and also his political philosophy of growing Ghana from Ghana, rather than depending on foreign aid and investments.

Early life and education
He was born on 1 August 1926 at Winneba in the Central Region. He obtained a diploma at the London Chamber of Commerce in 1940 and Sloan's Shorthand Certificate of Proficiency in 1942. He also obtained a diploma in commerce and industry from London School of Economics in 1956.

Career
Mr. Lartey worked with the then United Africa Company (UAC) from 1944 to 1958. There, he rose to the status of Senior Management and was posted to the Headquarters at Unilever House, London.
In Ghana, he established a number of businesses, they include the Lartey and Lartey Books and Stationary, which later became the nucleus of the Ghana Book Supply, Citadel Printing Press and the Federal Stores of Nigeria.

Politics
His political career started in 1969 when he contested the Gomoa East Constituency seat on the ticket of the National Alliance of Liberals (NAL). He was appointed a special adviser to Ignatius Kutu Acheampong's National Redemption Council government in 1972. In 1978 he represented the Gomoa Ewutu-Effutu in the constituent assembly in the writing of the constitution of the Third Republic.
In 1979 Mr. Lartey was a founding member of the People's National Party (PNP). In 1992 he was an aspiring presidential candidate of the National Independence Party (NIP), he lost to Kwabena Darko. He broke away from the Convention People's Party (CPP) to form the Great Consolidated Popular Party (GCPP). He run for president twice on the ticket of the GCPP on two occasions; in the 2000 presidential elections and the 2004 presidential elections. He was unable to run for the third time on the party's ticket in the 2008 presidential race because he was disqualified by the Electoral Commission for failing to submit his nomination papers on time. He managed to beat the 17 October 2008 deadline and paid the GH¢5,000 nomination fee but was told of errors and inconsistencies in his documents. The money and documents were returned, however, it was too late to beat the deadline.

Personal life
He was married to Sarah Rosetta Lartey (née Malm), also of blessed memory. His son Dr. Henry Herbert Lartey took over as the leader of the GCPP after his death.

Death
After a short stint in the United States of America where he had received medical treatment, he returned to Ghana on 29 November 2009 but passed away on Monday, 28 December 2009 at the Trust Hospital in Accra after a short illness.

See also
Great Consolidated Popular Party

References

External links

1926 births
2009 deaths
Ghanaian politicians
Alumni of the London School of Economics
Ghanaian expatriates in the United Kingdom